Štefan Čambal (17 December 1908 – 18 July 1990) was a Slovak football player and later a football manager. He played for Czechoslovakia, for which he played 22 matches. He was born in Pozsony and died in Prague.

He was a participant in the 1934 FIFA World Cup, where Czechoslovakia won the silver medal. At the tournament, Čambal became the first player of Slovak origin at a World Cup. In his country he started his career with 1. ČsŠK Bratislava, winning the 1927 amateur title in Czechoslovakia. He went on to play for clubs such as Teplitzer FK, SK Slavia Prague, SK Židenice and Baťa Zlín.

He was later a well-known football manager, coaching, amongst others, the Czechoslovakia national football team.

References

External links 
 
 

1908 births
1990 deaths
Slovak footballers
Czechoslovak footballers
Slovak football managers
Czechoslovak football managers
1934 FIFA World Cup players
Czechoslovakia international footballers
SK Slavia Prague players
ŠK Slovan Bratislava players
FC Zbrojovka Brno players
AC Sparta Prague managers
Czechoslovakia national football team managers
Czechoslovak expatriate sportspeople in East Germany
Expatriate football managers in East Germany
FK Vítkovice managers
FC Fastav Zlín managers
FC Lokomotíva Košice managers
Association football midfielders
Footballers from Bratislava
People from the Kingdom of Hungary
Sydney FC Prague managers
FC Fastav Zlín players